Albert L. Mason was a member of the Wisconsin State Assembly.

Biography
Mason was born in August 1824, sources have differed on the exact date and location. His father, Darius B. Mason, would become a member of the county board of Walworth County, Wisconsin. Albert married Sophronia Joiner in 1847. He died on March 26, 1896.

Career
Mason was a member of the Assembly in 1879. Other positions he held include postmaster and justice of the peace. He was a Republican.

References

People from Walworth County, Wisconsin
Republican Party members of the Wisconsin State Assembly
Wisconsin postmasters
American justices of the peace
1824 births
1896 deaths
19th-century American politicians
19th-century American judges